XIII is a first-person shooter video game developed by Maltese studio PlayMagic and published by Microids for PlayStation 4, Windows, and Xbox One in November 2020. The Nintendo Switch version of the game was released in September 2022. The PlayStation 5 and the Xbox Series X/S version of the game was released in September 13, 2022. It is a remake of the 2003 video game of the same name.

The game received negative reviews from critics and players. It was criticized for its changes to the art style, game design differences from the original, and the game's numerous technical and audio issues. Microids issued an apology for the game's technical issues on launch and in June 2022 announced that a major new update for the game, this time under the development of Tower Five that aims to improve the remake's quality, would be released in September 2022.

Plot

Development 
The remake of the original 2003 video game was announced on April 18, 2019 with PlayMagic developing the game and Microids publishing the game for Microsoft Windows, Nintendo Switch, PlayStation 4 and Xbox One. The game was originally scheduled for release on November 13, until it was delayed to 2020 for further development. In June 2020, the game was announced to be scheduled for release on November 10, 2020 for Windows, PlayStation 4 and Xbox One. In October 2020, it was announced that the port of the game for Nintendo Switch was delayed to 2021.

The original plan was to remaster the game using original assets and Unity plug-ins. Unfortunately, the original source code was deemed lost and the 2003 version was running in an extremely outdated game engine. Therefore, the team had no choice but to redo the entire game from scratch, which means hiring new staff and extending the release date to remake the levels, assets, cutscenes, and animations.

Due to the poor reception to the game, Microids announced in June 2022 that they had replaced PlayMagic with Tower Five as the developer, who had been working on fixing the issues from the 2020 release. Microids released the improved version on September 13, 2022, with this version given as a free update to those that bought the 2020 version.

Reception 

XIII received "generally unfavorable" reviews for most platforms according to review aggregator Metacritic; the PlayStation 5 version received "mixed or average" reviews.

A lot of criticism were aimed towards the remake's unnecessary changes from the original, such as the art style and the weapon limit, as well as the game's numerous technical and audio issues. Developer PlayMagic and publisher Microids issued a joint statement apologizing to players for the state of the game at release, adding that the COVID-19 pandemic had significantly affected the game's production. On Steam, the game received an "Overwhelmingly Negative" rating from players.

The release of the remake caused an increase in sales of the original game, causing the 2003 game to outsell the remake in the first week of the remake's release in the UK.

According to former staff of PlayMagic, it was reported that CEO and Creative Director Giuseppe Crugliano was to be blamed for the game's failure due to poor project management, a lack of staff, low morale, and toxic company culture. Crugliano denied these allegations but admitted to a problem with late payments, claiming they were the result of cash flow problems from project cancellations and unpaid fees from clients.

Notes

References

External links 
 

2020 video games
Adaptations of works by Jean Van Hamme
First-person shooters
Microïds games
Multiplayer and single-player video games
Nintendo Switch games
PlayStation 4 games
PlayStation 5 games
Stealth video games
Video game remakes
Video games developed in France
Video games developed in Malta
Video games based on comics
Video games set in New York City
Video games with cel-shaded animation
Windows games
Xbox One games
Xbox Series X and Series S games